Long Days, Black Night: The Alternative Anthology is a compilation album by the English rock band Magnum. It was released in 2002 by Sanctuary Records.

This album contains material from Kingdom of Madness, Magnum II, Marauder, Chase The Dragon, The Eleventh Hour, Invasion Live, On A Storyteller's Night, Stronghold, Rock Art, Keeping The Nite Light Burning and Archive.

At the time of its release, the only rarities this compilation offered were four tracks performed on the BBC Friday Rock Show session on 27 May 1983. The recording features Robin George on rhythm guitar. The session was later reissued on The Eleventh Hour in 2005 with the Sanctuary Records remastered and expanded series.

Track listing
All tracks written by Tony Clarkin except where noted.

Disc 1
"Kingdom of Madness" [LP version] – 4:25 originally released on Kingdom of Madness
"Universe" [LP version] – 3:45 originally released on Kingdom of Madness
"Invasion" [LP version] – 3:22 originally released on Kingdom of Madness
"In the Beginning" [Edit] – 4:17 originally released on the single "Kingdom of Madness"
"All Come Together" [LP version] – 4:53 originally released on Kingdom of Madness
"Great Adventure" [LP version] – 4:54 originally released on Magnum II
"Foolish Heart" [LP version] – 3:13 originally released on Magnum II
"Reborn" [LP version] – 5:45 originally released on Magnum II
"Changes" [Remix] – 4:11 originally released on the single "Changes Remix"
"If I Could Live Forever" [Live] – 4:07 originally released on Marauder
"All of My Life" [Live] – 6:17 originally released on the EP Live at the Marquee
"The Lights Burned Out" [LP version] – 4:32 originally released on Chase The Dragon
"Soldier of the Line" [LP version] – 4:16 originally released on Chase The Dragon
"The Spirit" [LP version] – 4:17 originally released on Chase The Dragon
"Sacred Hour" [LP version] – 5:35 originally released on Chase The Dragon
"The Teacher" [LP version] – 3:21 originally released on Chase The Dragon
"Runaround Sue" [Live] (Dion DiMucci and Ernie Maresca) – 3:29 originally released on Invasion Live

Disc 2
"The Prize" [LP version] – 3:40 originally released on The Eleventh Hour
"Road to Paradise" [LP version] – 3:30 originally released on The Eleventh Hour
"The Great Disaster" [LP version] – 3:47 originally released on The Eleventh Hour
"The Word" [LP version] – 4:54 originally released on The Eleventh Hour
"Breakdown" [LP version] – 4:00 originally released on The Eleventh Hour
"Just Like an Arrow" [LP version] – 3:21 originally released on On A Storyteller's Night
"Endless Love" [LP version] – 4:28 originally released on On A Storyteller's Night
"How Far Jerusalem" [LP version] – 6:26 originally released on On A Storyteller's Night
"On a Storyteller's Night" [LP version] – 5:01 originally released on On A Storyteller's Night
"Before First Light" [LP version] – 3:53 originally released on On A Storyteller's Night
"Rock Heavy" [LP version] – 4:01 originally released on Rock Art
"The Tall Ships" [Live] – 6:14 originally released on Stronghold
"Vigilante" [Live] – 5:41 originally released on Stronghold
"Days of No Trust" [Live] – 4:51 originally released on Stronghold
"Start Talking Love" [Live] – 4:25 originally released on Stronghold
"Rockin' Chair" [Live] (Tony Clarkin and Russ Ballard) – 4:41 originally released on Stronghold

Disc 3
"Only in America" [Live] – 4:24 originally released on Stronghold
"Les Mort Dansant" [Live] – 5:24 originally released on Stronghold
"Wild Swan" [Live] – 6:20 originally released on Stronghold
"Heart Broken Busted" [Acoustic] – 3:33 originally released on Keeping The Nite Light Burning
"Foolish Heart" [Acoustic] – 2:56 originally released on Keeping The Nite Light Burning
"Lonely Night" [Acoustic] – 4:17 originally released on Keeping The Nite Light Burning
"Without Your Love" [Acoustic] – 4:47 originally released on Keeping The Nite Light Burning
"Sea Bird" [Demo] – 3:51 originally released on Archive
"Stormbringer" [Demo] – 3:33 originally released on Archive
"Slipping Away" [Demo] – 3:17 originally released on Archive
"Captain America" [Demo] – 3:45 originally released on Archive
"True Fine Love" [Outtake] – 3:25 originally released on Archive

Bonus tracks: BBC Friday Rock Show  session 27 May 1983
<LI>"The Prize" [BBC session] – 3:28
<LI>"Breakdown" [BBC session] – 3:56
<LI>"Vicious Companions" [BBC session] – 3:29
<LI>"Road to Paradise" [BBC session] – 3:00

Personnel
Tony Clarkin – guitars, vocals
Bob Catley – vocals
Dave Morgan - bass guitar, lead vocals
Colin "Wally" Lowe – bass guitar, vocals
Richard Bailey – keyboards, flute, vocals
Mark Stanway – keyboards
Kex Gorin – drums, percussions
Jim Simpson – drums, percussions
Mickey Barker – drums, percussions

Additional musicians
for Keeping The Nite Light Burning, The Red Lemon Horns
Paul Roberts – trombone
Bob Poutney – trumpet
Rob Hughes – saxophone
Gill Stevenson – cello
for the BBC Friday Rock Show session 27 May 1983
Robin George — rhythm guitar

References

External links
 www.magnumonline.co.uk — Official Magnum site

Albums produced by Leo Lyons
Albums produced by Tony Clarkin
Magnum (band) compilation albums
1998 compilation albums
Sanctuary Records compilation albums
Albums produced by Jeff Glixman